Hyloxalus pumilus is a species of frogs in the family Dendrobatidae. It is endemic to southern Ecuador where it is only known from its type locality in the Azuay Province.
Its natural habitats are cloud forests. It is threatened by habitat loss and degradation.

References

pumilus
Amphibians of the Andes
Amphibians of Ecuador
Endemic fauna of Ecuador
Amphibians described in 1991
Taxonomy articles created by Polbot